Eurico Monteiro Gomes (born 29 September 1955), known simply as Eurico in his playing days, is a Portuguese former professional footballer who played as a central defender, and is a manager.

He started out at Benfica and later played for Sporting and Porto, becoming the second player to have represented the Big Three in his country and the only to have been champion in all three clubs (twice with each). He amassed Primeira Liga totals of 313 matches and seven goals during 14 seasons, and won 12 major titles. He subsequently embarked on a lengthy managerial career.

Eurico played nearly 40 times with the Portugal national team, appearing at Euro 1984.

Club career
Born in Santa Marta de Penaguião, Vila Real District, Eurico made his professional debut with S.L. Benfica at the age of 19, being regularly used in four Primeira Liga seasons and winning back-to-back national championships with the club (he also reached two domestic cup finals). In 1979 he switched to Lisbon rivals Sporting CP, only missing one league game during his three-year spell and winning a total of three titles, including the double in 1981–82.

Aged 27, Eurico signed with another team from the country's Big Three, FC Porto, again rarely missing one match until suffering a severe injury early into the 1985–86 campaign. He started in the final of the 1983–84 UEFA Cup Winners' Cup, a 1–2 loss against Juventus F.C. in Basel.

After only one league appearance in his last two seasons at Porto combined, due to a run-in with manager Artur Jorge – he still managed to take part in the side's victorious run in the European Cup – Eurico signed with Vitória F.C. still in the top level, retiring from football at the age of nearly 34.

Gomes took up coaching in 1989, managing a host of teams in Portugal. He helped F.C. Tirsense promote to the top division in 1994, then coached them in a further two full seasons, the latter one ending in relegation. Early into 1996–97 he agreed to terminate his contract with the northerners and joined U.D. Leiria, suffering another top flight relegation (he was one of the club's three managers during the campaign).

In 2006 and 2007, Gomes worked in Algeria with JSM Béjaïa and MC Oran. The following year, on 10 October, he was appointed at Ethnikos Piraeus F.C. in Greece (second division), failing to win promotion.

International career
Eurico earned 38 caps for Portugal, scoring three goals. His first appearance with the national side was a 1–0 win over the United States in a friendly match, on 20 September 1978, and his final game was played on 3 April 1985 in another exhibition game, now a 0–2 loss with Italy.

Selected for UEFA Euro 1984 in France, Eurico played in all the matches and minutes as Portugal reached the semi-final stage of the competition.

|}

Honours

Player
Benfica
Primeira Divisão: 1975–76, 1976–77

Sporting
Primeira Divisão: 1979–80, 1981–82
Taça de Portugal: 1981–82

Porto
Primeira Divisão: 1984–85, 1985–86
Taça de Portugal: 1983–84
Supertaça Cândido de Oliveira: 1983, 1984

Manager
Tirsense
Segunda Divisão: 1993–94

References

External links
 
 
 
 

1955 births
Living people
People from Santa Marta de Penaguião
Portuguese footballers
Association football defenders
Primeira Liga players
S.L. Benfica footballers
Sporting CP footballers
FC Porto players
Vitória F.C. players
Portugal under-21 international footballers
Portugal international footballers
UEFA Euro 1984 players
Portuguese football managers
Primeira Liga managers
Liga Portugal 2 managers
Saudi Professional League managers
Rio Ave F.C. managers
Varzim S.C. managers
C.D. Nacional managers
F.C. Maia managers
U.D. Leiria managers
F.C. Paços de Ferreira managers
JSM Béjaïa managers
MC Oran managers
Al-Wehda Club (Mecca) managers
Al-Raed FC managers
Portuguese expatriate football managers
Expatriate football managers in Algeria
Expatriate football managers in Greece
Expatriate football managers in Saudi Arabia
Sportspeople from Vila Real District